Rastorguev Glacier is a large tributary glacier which drains the east slopes of the Explorers Range between Mount Ford and Sturm and joins Lillie Glacier via Flensing Icefall. Mapped by United States Geological Survey (USGS) from surveys and U.S. Navy air photos, 1960–62. Named by Advisory Committee on Antarctic Names (US-ACAN) after Vladimir I. Rastorguev, Soviet IGY observer, a Weather Central meteorologist at Little America V in 1957.

Glaciers of Pennell Coast